Robert J. Graf (June 2, 1906 - May 26, 1988) was an American canoeist who competed in the 1936 Summer Olympics.

He was born in Philadelphia.

In 1936, he finished fifth together with his partner Clarence McNutt in the C-2 1000 metre event.

References 
Sports-reference.com profile

1906 births
1988 deaths
Sportspeople from Philadelphia
American male canoeists
Canoeists at the 1936 Summer Olympics
Olympic canoeists of the United States